Encore Woody Herman–1963 is a 1963 live album by Woody Herman and his big band recorded at Basin Street West Jazz Club in Los Angeles, California, in May 1963.

Track listing 
 "That's Where It Is" (Teddy Castion) - 3:58  
 "Watermelon Man" (Herbie Hancock) - 5:45  
 "Body and Soul" (Edward Heyman, Robert Sour, Frank Eyton, Johnny Green) - 4:50
 "Better Get It In Your Soul" (Charles Mingus) - 5:27
 "Jazz Me Blues" (Tom Delaney) - 2:52
 "El Toro Grande" (Bill Chase) 4:50
 "Days of Wine and Roses" (Henry Mancini, Johnny Mercer) 3:15
 "Caldonia" (Fleecie Moore) - 7:40

Personnel 
 Nat Pierce - arranger, piano
 Bob Hammer - arranger
 Jack Gale - arranger, trombone
 Bill Chase  - arranger, trumpet
 Chuck Andrus - double bass
 Woody Herman - clarinet, conductor, vocals on "Camel Walk"
 Phil Wilson - trombone
 Sal Nistico, Gordon Brisker, Larry Cavelli - tenor saxophone
 Eddie Morgan - trombone
 Paul Fontaine, Dave Gale, Billy Hunt, Gerald Lamy - trumpet
 Jake Hanna - drums\
Frank Hittner, baritone saxophone

References

External links 
Discogs - Encore

1963 live albums
Woody Herman albums
Philips Records live albums